Vračovice-Orlov is a municipality in Ústí nad Orlicí District in the Pardubice Region of the Czech Republic. It has about 200 inhabitants.

Administrative parts
The municipality is made up of villages of Vračovice and Orlov.

References

Villages in Ústí nad Orlicí District